The 2021–22 Houston Baptist Huskies men's basketball team represented Houston Baptist University, now known as Houston Christian University, in the 2021–22 NCAA Division I men's basketball season. The Huskies, led by 31st-year head coach Ron Cottrell, played their home games at Sharp Gymnasium in Houston, Texas as members of the Southland Conference.

On September 21, 2022, the university announced that it had changed its name to Houston Christian University. The Huskies nickname was not affected.

Previous season 
In a season limited due to the ongoing COVID-19 pandemic, the Huskies finished the 2020–21 season 6–19, 4–11 in Southland play to finish in eleventh place. They upset Incarnate Word in the first round of the Southland tournament, before falling to Lamar in the second round.

Roster

Schedule and results

|-
!colspan=12 style=| Non-conference Regular season

|-
!colspan=12 style=| Southland Conference season

|-
!colspan=9 style=| Southland tournament

|-

Source

References

Houston Christian Huskies men's basketball seasons
Houston Baptist Huskies
Houston Baptist Huskies men's basketball
Houston Baptist Huskies men's basketball